Allianze University College of Medical Sciences was a private higher learning institution located at Kepala Batas, Pulau Pinang that ran courses in medicine, hospitality, tourism, sports science and allied health sciences. It closed in 2014 after protests from unpaid staff, and a failed bid to open a branch in London, England.

In 2013 the university acquired Trent Park House in north London for £30 million (US$47 million) from Middlesex University but the building and campus was never developed and it has been speculated that the size of the deal led to the closure of the college in 2014. Trent Park House was subsequently sold to Berkeley Homes.

It already ceased operations as of today.

References

Medical schools in Malaysia
Private universities and colleges in Malaysia
Trent Park